Cathal Kiely (born 2001) is an Irish hurler who plays for Offaly SHC club Kilcormac-Killoughey and at inter-county level with the Offaly senior hurling team.

Career

Kiely first played hurling at juvenile and underage levels with the Kilcormac-Killoughey club. He won an Offaly U20 HC title after a defeat of Belmont in the final in 2021. Kiely had already joined the club's senior team by this stage, and top scored with 0-07 when Kilcormac were beaten by Shinrone in the 2022 SHC final.

Kiely first appeared on the inter-county scene for Offaly as top scorer during the 2018 All-Ireland MHC. He immediately progressed to the under-20 team and was overall top scorer during the 2019 All-Ireland U20HC. He was Offaly's top scorer for his three-year under-20 tenure. Kiely made his senior team debut during the 2023 Walsh Cup.

Personal life

His brother, Cillian Kiely, has also lined out with Offaly.

Honours

Kilcormac-Killoughey
Offaly Under-20 Hurling Championship: 2021

References

2001 births
Living people
Kilcormac-Killoughey hurlers
Offaly inter-county hurlers